Marston Marshes is a   Local Nature Reserve on the southern outskirts of Norwich in Norfolk. It is owned and managed by Norwich City Council.

This site in the flood plain of the River Yare has marshes (hence the name), fen, dykes, scrub, wet woodland, dry grassland and five ponds. Flora include ragged robin and southern marsh orchid and there many invertebrates including the rare Desmoulin's whorl snail.

There is access from Marston Lane.

References

Local Nature Reserves in Norfolk